Richard Dunnell Gillingwater CBE (born July 1956) is a British businessman, chairman of Janus Henderson Group plc, former chairman of SSE plc, and the pro-chancellor of the Open University

Richard Dunnell Gillingwater was born in July 1956.

Gillingwater has a law degree from Oxford University, and an MBA from IMD Lausanne.

Gillingwater was the chairman of SSE plc from July 2015 to July 2020, and a non-executive director since May 2007. He was the pro-chancellor of the Open University between 2015-2018. He is the chairman of Janus Henderson Group plc, and a non-executive director of Helical Bar plc.

References

1956 births
Alumni of the University of Oxford
British businesspeople
Commanders of the Order of the British Empire
SSE plc
Living people